

Judy Bennett (born 1943) is a English voice actor whose career in radio began with the long-running soap opera The Archers, in which she played the role of Shula Hebden-Lloyd from 1971-2022. She played Shula's twin brother Kenton and younger sister Elizabeth before assuming the role of Shula herself.

She has voiced characters in a number of cartoon series, including The Perishers (1979) and Dennis the Menace and Gnasher in the late 1990s.

She attended Notre Dame Mount Pleasant High School (a girls' catholic grammar school, now St Julie's Catholic High School) in Liverpool.

Bennett studied at the Guildhall School of Music and Drama. In 1976 she married Canadian-English actor Charles Collingwood, who plays Archers character Brian Aldridge. Actress Jane Collingwood (born 1979) is their daughter.

See also
 List of The Archers characters
 List of voice actors

Notes

References

External links

Further reading
 

1943 births
Living people
20th-century English actresses
Actresses from Liverpool
Alumni of the Guildhall School of Music and Drama
The Archers
English television actresses
English voice actresses
Audiobook narrators